Goldenville School of Montessori, Inc. is a private school on the southern part of San Ildefonso. It has the most expensive tuition and matriculation fee in San Ildefonso. There are about 500 students in this school right now and many of them have been here since they were toddlers. The casa's tuition fee is more than 40,000, the elementary's is about 30,000 and the high school's tuition fee is about more than 20,000. It does not have kindergarten level but it has a casa because it is a Montessori school and it is also the first Montessori school in San Ildefonso.

Academic ranks on polls for best schools

SI Polls surveyed to determine the best school in San Ildefonso, Bulacan. The results were given on June 9, 2014, and GVSM Ranks 2.

Grade Levels

References

Schools in Bulacan
Montessori schools in the Philippines
Educational institutions established in 1994